The Spirit Dance is one of the dances of the Waashat religion, a native religion in the Pacific Northwest of North America.

Spirit Dance may also refer to:


Religion 
 Mountain Spirit Dance, a traditional dance of the Yavapai, a North American native tribe
 A spirit dance of the Apache, a North American native tribe
 Faun phii ("spirit dance" or "ghost dance"), a Thai religious ceremony honoring ancestral spirits
 Jagar, a Hindu religious ceremony invoking ancestral spirits in Uttarakhand, India.

Music

Albums 
 Spirit Dance (Michael White album), 1972
 Spirit Dance, the debut album by Nitin Sawhney
 Spirit Dance, the debut album by Animus
 Spirit Dance, a 1997 album by Peter Buffett
 Spirit Dance, a 2010 album by David Braid and Canadian Brass

Songs 
 "Yulunga (Spirit Dance)", a song Dead Can Dance on their 1993 album Into the Labyrinth
 魂之舞 "Spirit Dance", a song by Twelve Girls Band on their debut album Meili Yinyuehui

See also 
 Ghost Dance (disambiguation)
 American Spirit Dance Company, a dance company in association with Oklahoma City University
 Spirit Dance Entertainment, a former American film production company by Forest Whitaker
 Spirit Dance Team, a club at the McFarland High School in Wisconsin
 Spirit Dancer, a 2002 album by BlackHawk